Vaneq-e Olya (also Romanized as Vāneq-e ‘Olyā; also known as Vāneq-e Bālā) is a village in Molla Yaqub Rural District, in the Central District of Sarab County, East Azerbaijan Province, Iran. At the 2006 census, its population was 103, in 18 families.

References 

Populated places in Sarab County